Gyromitra californica is a species of fungus in the family Discinaceae.  It was described as Helvella californica by W. Phillips in 1879. It is considered probably poisonous.

References

External links

Discinaceae
Fungi described in 1879
Fungi of North America
Fungi of California